Summer Moonshine is a novel by P. G. Wodehouse, first published in the United States on 8 October 1937 by Doubleday, Doran, New York, and in the United Kingdom on 11 February 1938 by Herbert Jenkins, London. It was serialised in The Saturday Evening Post (US) from 24 July to 11 September 1937 and in Pearson's Magazine (UK) between September 1937 and April 1938.

Plot
Former big-game hunter Sir Buckstone Abbott, finding himself hard up, takes in paying guests at his pile, Walsingford Hall, while hoping to sell the place to a wealthy Princess. Soon, many schemes, plots and romantic entanglements are going on.

References

External links
The Russian Wodehouse Society's page, with a list of characters

Novels by P. G. Wodehouse
English novels
Works originally published in The Saturday Evening Post
Novels first published in serial form
1937 British novels
Herbert Jenkins books
Doubleday, Doran books
British comedy novels